On 21 March 2019, a major explosion occurred at a chemical plant in Chenjiagang Chemical Industry Park, Chenjiagang, Xiangshui County, Yancheng, Jiangsu, China. According to reports published on March 25, 78 people were killed and 617 injured.

The State Council of China officially recognized the severity of the accident, often referred to as "3.21 Explosive Accident".

Background
The facility—located in Yancheng's industrial park—was operated by Tianjiayi Chemical, and was used to produce fertilizer or pesticides. Some sources reported that the plant produced organic chemicals, including some highly flammable compounds. Tianjiayi Chemical had previously been penalized six times for infractions of pollution and waste management laws, and China Daily reported fines over safety issues.  This plant has had previous fires and deaths since there is not a government program to keep chemical plants like this one up to standard to prevent future disasters.  According to the South China Morning Post, this plant paid bribes, paid journalists and local officials so this chemical plant could remain open without any negative publicity or reasons to shut down. This information comes from an engineer who helped to create this plant and other similar plants who have disregarded multiple safety regulations. Communist Party general secretary Xi Jinping and State Council premier Li Keqiang are "demanding the government to shut down these chemical firms when they do not comply to safety regulations it is so disregarded".

On 27 November 2007, an explosion occurred in one of the chemical factories in Chenjiagang Chemical Zone, with seven killed and around 50 injured. On 23 November 2010, more than thirty were poisoned by a toxic gas release. In the early morning of 11 February 2011, rumors of toxic chemical release and potential imminent explosions in the Chenjiagang Chemical Industry Park led over ten thousand residents to evacuate in panic from the towns of Chenjiagang and Shuanggang during which four people died and many were injured. On the afternoon of May 18 and again on July 26 in 2011, there were explosions at local factories.

Explosion
The 21 March 2019 explosion occurred at a local time of 14:48 (06:48 GMT). 78 people were killed, and at least 94 were severely injured, 32 of whom were critically injured. Around 640 people required hospital treatment and were taken to 16 hospitals. The injured included children at a local kindergarten.

The force of the blast started numerous fires in Yancheng, knocked down several buildings, and reportedly destroyed windows several kilometers away. The fire was reported to have been controlled by 03:00 local time. Considerable damage was caused to nearby factories and offices; the roof of Henglida Chemical Factory, 3 km from the explosion, fell in. At least one of the people killed was in another building destroyed by the blast. Windows are reported to have been blown out up to 6 km away from the explosion, and houses and other buildings were damaged in the nearby village-level administrative divisions including Hai'an Town (Haianju) and Shadang. This explosion was strong enough that it registered on earthquake sensors and could be seen by satellites. The blast created a crater resulting in a magnitude 2.2 seismic shock that took over 900 firefighters to get the fire under control.

Aftermath
The search for survivors was ongoing on 23 March; one survivor was rescued from the site on the morning of 23 March, but 25 of the 28 people earlier reported missing were found dead. According to the Jiangsu environmental protection bureau, the monitored levels of benzene, toluene, and xylene in the area were not abnormal, and levels of acetone and chloroform outside the explosion area were within normal limits. However, according to the South China Morning Post article entitled "Devastation at blast site after China chemical plant explosion leaves at least 64 dead, 640 injured" discusses the point of the surrounding three rivers were polluted with exceedingly high levels of dichloroethane and dichloromethane, at 2.8x and 8.4x  the normal level according to national water quality standards. The  crater, 2 m (6 ft) deep, is required to be filled in along with neutralizing the soil to prevent contamination to the surrounding community. "This chemical plant was flattened along with the surrounding 16 factories also have varying degrees of damage" per the South China Morning Post.

The precise cause of the explosion is not yet known. There were no reports of anything abnormal at the plant before the explosion. A worker at the plant has reported the cause was a fire in a natural gas tanker that spread to benzoyl storage tank, but this has not been confirmed.

According to Radio Free Asia, during the disaster, the local government used anti-drone technology to stop drones being used by journalists. The local government prevented outside media from entering the disaster area and hospitals to conduct interviews. Interviews were only granted to some in the Chinese media.

On 4 April 2019, the Standing Committee of the Yancheng Committee of the Communist Party of China had a meeting at which it was decided to definitively close down the Xiangshui Chemical Industry Park.

On 15 November, the State Council approved the investigation report, presented by the investigation team of the State Council. The report asserts the explosion accident being a serious production safety accident: there was a long-term practice of illegal storage of hazardous waste, resulting in spontaneous combustion and explosion.

The CPC Central Commission for Discipline Inspection and the State Supervisory Commission issued warnings to Fan Jinlong and Fei Gaoyun, Jiangsu Provincial People's Government executive deputy governor and deputy governor, respectively. At the same time, investigations and criminal charges filed against 44 enterprises and executives, for illegal storage of dangerous substances, significant violations of labor safety measures, environmental pollution, and forgery of certification documents.

Controversy 
The Washington Post and the Financial Times recently reported about dissatisfaction and criticism of the Internet censorship growing around this accident, where many news articles and social media posts were deleted.

According to Radio Free Asia, the local government dispatched drone jamming equipment and shot down drones used for aerial photography. The government also banned foreign media from entering the disaster area, and conducting interviews with hospitals.

The Beijing News ridiculed the local government for enforcing the principle of "prevent fire, prevent theft, and prevent journalists".

See also
 List of explosions
 2020 Beirut explosions
 2015 Tianjin explosions

References

2019 industrial disasters
Chemical plant explosions
Explosions in 2019
History of Jiangsu
Industrial fires and explosions in China
Man-made disasters in China
March 2019 events in China
Chenjiagang